The Greek alphabet has been used to write the Greek language since the late 9th or early 8th century BCE. It is derived from the earlier Phoenician alphabet, and was the earliest known alphabetic script to have distinct letters for vowels as well as consonants. In Archaic and early Classical times, the Greek alphabet existed in many local variants, but, by the end of the 4th century BCE, the Euclidean alphabet, with 24 letters, ordered from alpha to omega, had become standard and it is this version that is still used for Greek writing today.

The uppercase and lowercase forms of the 24 letters are: 

The Greek alphabet is the ancestor of the Latin and Cyrillic scripts. Like Latin and Cyrillic, Greek originally had only a single form of each letter; it developed the letter case distinction between uppercase and lowercase in parallel with Latin during the modern era. Sound values and conventional transcriptions for some of the letters differ between Ancient and Modern Greek usage because the pronunciation of Greek has changed significantly between the 5th century BCE and today. Modern and Ancient Greek also use different diacritics, with modern Greek keeping only the stress accent (acute) and the diaeresis.

Apart from its use in writing the Greek language, in both its ancient and its modern forms, the Greek alphabet today also serves as a source of technical symbols and labels in many domains of mathematics, science, and other fields.

Letters

Sound values 

In both Ancient and Modern Greek, the letters of the Greek alphabet have fairly stable and consistent symbol-to-sound mappings, making pronunciation of words largely predictable. Ancient Greek spelling was generally near-phonemic. For a number of letters, sound values differ considerably between Ancient and Modern Greek, because their pronunciation has followed a set of systematic phonological shifts that affected the language in its post-classical stages.

Examples

Notes

Among consonant letters, all letters that denoted voiced plosive consonants and aspirated plosives in Ancient Greek stand for corresponding fricative sounds in Modern Greek. The correspondences are as follows:

Among the vowel symbols, Modern Greek sound values reflect the radical simplification of the vowel system of post-classical Greek, merging multiple formerly distinct vowel phonemes into a much smaller number. This leads to several groups of vowel letters denoting identical sounds today. Modern Greek orthography remains true to the historical spellings in most of these cases. As a consequence, the spellings of words in Modern Greek are often not predictable from the pronunciation alone, while the reverse mapping, from spelling to pronunciation, is usually regular and predictable.

The following vowel letters and digraphs are involved in the mergers:

Modern Greek speakers typically use the same, modern symbol–sound mappings in reading Greek of all historical stages. In other countries, students of Ancient Greek may use a variety of conventional approximations of the historical sound system in pronouncing Ancient Greek.

Digraphs and letter combinations 
Several letter combinations have special conventional sound values different from those of their single components. Among them are several digraphs of vowel letters that formerly represented diphthongs but are now monophthongized.

Diacritics 

In the polytonic orthography traditionally used for ancient Greek, the stressed vowel of each word carries one of three accent marks: either the acute accent, the grave accent, or the circumflex accent ( or ). These signs were originally designed to mark different forms of the phonological pitch accent in Ancient Greek. By the time their use became conventional and obligatory in Greek writing, in late antiquity, pitch accent was evolving into a single stress accent, and thus the three signs have not corresponded to a phonological distinction in actual speech ever since. In addition to the accent marks, every word-initial vowel must carry either of two so-called "breathing marks": the rough breathing, marking an  sound at the beginning of a word, or the smooth breathing, marking its absence. The letter rho (ρ), although not a vowel, also carries rough breathing in a word-initial position. If a rho was geminated within a word, the first  always had the smooth breathing and the second the rough breathing (ῤῥ) leading to the transliteration rrh.

This iota represents the former offglide of what were originally long diphthongs,  (i.e. ), which became monophthongized during antiquity.

Another diacritic used in Greek is the diaeresis, indicating a hiatus.

This system of diacritics was first developed by the scholar Aristophanes of Byzantium ( 257 –  185/180 BC), who worked at the Musaeum in Alexandria during the third century BC. Aristophanes of Byzantium also was the first to divide poems into lines, rather than writing them like prose, and also introduced a series of signs for textual criticism. In 1982, a new, simplified orthography, known as "monotonic", was adopted for official use in Modern Greek by the Greek state. It uses only a single accent mark, the acute (also known in this context as tonos, i.e. simply "accent"), marking the stressed syllable of polysyllabic words, and occasionally the diaeresis to distinguish diphthongal from digraph readings in pairs of vowel letters, making this monotonic system very similar to the accent mark system used in Spanish. The polytonic system is still conventionally used for writing Ancient Greek, while in some book printing and generally in the usage of conservative writers it can still also be found in use for Modern Greek.

Romanization 

There are many different methods of rendering Greek text or Greek names in the Latin script. The form in which classical Greek names are conventionally rendered in English goes back to the way Greek loanwords were incorporated into Latin in antiquity. Smooth breathing marks are usually ignored and rough breathing marks are usually rendered as the letter .

Transcription conventions for Modern Greek differ widely, depending on their purpose, on how close they stay to the conventional letter correspondences of Ancient Greek-based transcription systems, and to what degree they attempt either an exact letter-by-letter transliteration or rather a phonetically-based transcription. Standardized formal transcription systems have been defined by the International Organization for Standardization (as ISO 843), by the United Nations Group of Experts on Geographical Names, by the Library of Congress, and others.

History

Origins 

During the Mycenaean period, from around the sixteenth century to the twelfth century BC, Linear B was used to write the earliest attested form of the Greek language, known as Mycenaean Greek. This writing system, unrelated to the Greek alphabet, last appeared in the thirteenth century BC. In the late ninth century BC or early eighth century BC, the Greek alphabet emerged. The period between the use of the two writing systems, during which no Greek texts are attested, is known as the Greek Dark Ages. The Greeks adopted the alphabet from the earlier Phoenician alphabet, one of the closely related scripts used for the West Semitic languages, calling it Φοινικήια γράμματα 'Phoenician letters'. However, the Phoenician alphabet is limited to consonants. When it was adopted for writing Greek, certain consonants were adapted to express vowels. The use of both vowels and consonants makes Greek the first alphabet in the narrow sense, as distinguished from the abjads used in Semitic languages, which have letters only for consonants.

Greek initially took over all of the 22 letters of Phoenician. A doublet of waw was also borrowed as a consonant for [w] (Ϝ, digamma). In addition, the Phoenician letter for the emphatic glottal  (heth) was borrowed in two different functions by different dialects of Greek: as a letter for /h/ (Η, heta) by those dialects that had such a sound, and as an additional vowel letter for the long  (Η, eta) by those dialects that lacked the consonant. Eventually, a seventh vowel letter for the long  (Ω, omega) was introduced.

The origin of these letters is a matter of some debate.

Three of the original Phoenician letters dropped out of use before the alphabet took its classical shape: the letter Ϻ (san), which had been in competition with Σ (sigma) denoting the same phoneme /s/; the letter Ϙ (qoppa), which was redundant with Κ (kappa) for /k/, and Ϝ (digamma), whose sound value /w/ dropped out of the spoken language before or during the classical period.

Greek was originally written predominantly from right to left, just like Phoenician, but scribes could freely alternate between directions. For a time, a writing style with alternating right-to-left and left-to-right lines (called boustrophedon, literally "ox-turning", after the manner of an ox ploughing a field) was common, until in the classical period the left-to-right writing direction became the norm. Individual letter shapes were mirrored depending on the writing direction of the current line.

Archaic variants 

There were initially numerous local (epichoric) variants of the Greek alphabet, which differed in the use and non-use of the additional vowel and consonant symbols and several other features. Epichoric alphabets are commonly divided into four major types according to their different treatments of additional consonant letters for the aspirated consonants (/pʰ, kʰ/) and consonant clusters (/ks, ps/) of Greek. These four types are often conventionally labelled as "green", "red", "light blue" and "dark blue" types, based on a colour-coded map in a seminal 19th-century work on the topic, Studien zur Geschichte des griechischen Alphabets by Adolf Kirchhoff (1867).

The "green" (or southern) type is the most archaic and closest to the Phoenician. The "red" (or western) type is the one that was later transmitted to the West and became the ancestor of the Latin alphabet, and bears some crucial features characteristic of that later development. The "blue" (or eastern) type is the one from which the later standard Greek alphabet emerged. Athens used a local form of the "light blue" alphabet type until the end of the fifth century BC, which lacked the letters Ξ and Ψ as well as the vowel symbols Η and Ω. The letter  (heta) was used for the consonant . Some variant local letter forms were also characteristic of Athenian writing, some of which were shared with the neighboring (but otherwise "red") alphabet of Euboia: a form of  that resembled a Latin L and a form of  that resembled a Latin S.

*Upsilon is also derived from waw.

The classical twenty-four-letter alphabet that is now used to represent the Greek language was originally the local alphabet of Ionia. By the late fifth century BC, it was commonly used by many Athenians. In  403 BC, at the suggestion of the archon Eucleides, the Athenian Assembly formally abandoned the Old Attic alphabet and adopted the Ionian alphabet as part of the democratic reforms after the overthrow of the Thirty Tyrants. Because of Eucleides's role in suggesting the idea to adopt the Ionian alphabet, the standard twenty-four-letter Greek alphabet is sometimes known as the "Eucleidean alphabet". Roughly thirty years later, the Eucleidean alphabet was adopted in Boeotia and it may have been adopted a few years previously in Macedonia. By the end of the fourth century BC, it had displaced local alphabets across the Greek-speaking world to become the standard form of the Greek alphabet.

Letter names 
When the Greeks adopted the Phoenician alphabet, they took over not only the letter shapes and sound values but also the names by which the sequence of the alphabet could be recited and memorized. In Phoenician, each letter name was a word that began with the sound represented by that letter; thus ʾaleph, the word for "ox", was used as the name for the glottal stop , bet, or "house", for the  sound, and so on. When the letters were adopted by the Greeks, most of the Phoenician names were maintained or modified slightly to fit Greek phonology; thus, ʾaleph, bet, gimel became alpha, beta, gamma.

The Greek names of the following letters are more or less straightforward continuations of their Phoenician antecedents. Between Ancient and Modern Greek, they have remained largely unchanged, except that their pronunciation has followed regular sound changes along with other words (for instance, in the name of beta, ancient /b/ regularly changed to modern /v/, and ancient /ɛː/ to modern /i/, resulting in the modern pronunciation vita). The name of lambda is attested in early sources as  besides ; in Modern Greek the spelling is often , reflecting pronunciation. Similarly, iota is sometimes spelled  in Modern Greek ( is conventionally transcribed  word-initially and intervocalically before back vowels and ). In the tables below, the Greek names of all letters are given in their traditional polytonic spelling; in modern practice, like with all other words, they are usually spelled in the simplified monotonic system.

In the cases of the three historical sibilant letters below, the correspondence between Phoenician and Ancient Greek is less clear, with apparent mismatches both in letter names and sound values. The early history of these letters (and the fourth sibilant letter, obsolete san) has been a matter of some debate. Here too, the changes in the pronunciation of the letter names between Ancient and Modern Greek are regular.

Their modern names contain adjectival qualifiers that were added during the Byzantine period, to distinguish between letters that had become confusable. The letter  was called e psilon ("plain e") to distinguish it from the identically pronounced digraph , while, similarly, which at this time was pronounced , was called y psilon ("plain y") to distinguish it from the identically pronounced digraph .

Letter shapes 

Like Latin and other alphabetic scripts, Greek originally had only a single form of each letter, without a distinction between uppercase and lowercase. This distinction is an innovation of the modern era, drawing on different lines of development of the letter shapes in earlier handwriting.

The oldest forms of the letters in antiquity are majuscule forms. Besides the upright, straight inscriptional forms (capitals) found in stone carvings or incised pottery, more fluent writing styles adapted for handwriting on soft materials were also developed during antiquity. Such handwriting has been preserved especially from papyrus manuscripts in Egypt since the Hellenistic period. Ancient handwriting developed two distinct styles: uncial writing, with carefully drawn, rounded block letters of about equal size, used as a book hand for carefully produced literary and religious manuscripts, and cursive writing, used for everyday purposes. The cursive forms approached the style of lowercase letter forms, with ascenders and descenders, as well as many connecting lines and ligatures between letters.

In the ninth and tenth century, uncial book hands were replaced with a new, more compact writing style, with letter forms partly adapted from the earlier cursive. This minuscule style remained the dominant form of handwritten Greek into the modern era. During the Renaissance, western printers adopted the minuscule letter forms as lowercase printed typefaces, while modeling uppercase letters on the ancient inscriptional forms. The orthographic practice of using the letter case distinction for marking proper names, titles, etc. developed in parallel to the practice in Latin and other western languages.

Derived alphabets 

The Greek alphabet was the model for various others:
 The Etruscan alphabet;
 The Latin alphabet, together with various other ancient scripts in Italy, adopted from an archaic form of the Greek alphabet brought to Italy by Greek colonists in the late 8th century BC, via Etruscan;
 The Gothic alphabet, devised in the 4th century AD to write the Gothic language, based on a combination of Greek and Latin uncial models;
 The Glagolitic alphabet, devised in the 9th century AD for writing Old Church Slavonic;
 The Cyrillic script, which replaced the Glagolitic alphabet shortly afterwards.
 The Coptic Alphabet used for writing the Coptic language.

The Armenian and Georgian alphabets are almost certainly modeled on the Greek alphabet, but their graphic forms are quite different.

Other uses

Use for other languages 
Apart from the daughter alphabets listed above, which were adapted from Greek but developed into separate writing systems, the Greek alphabet has also been adopted at various times and in various places to write other languages. For some of them, additional letters were introduced.

Antiquity 
 Most of the Iron Age alphabets of Asia Minor were also adopted around the same time, as the early Greek alphabet was adopted from the Phoenician Alphabet. The Lydian and Carian alphabets are generally believed to derive from the Greek alphabet, although it is not clear which variant is the direct ancestor. While some of these alphabets such as Phrygian had slight differences from the Greek counterpart, some like Carian alphabet had mostly different values and several other characters inherited from pre-Greek local scripts. They were in use c. 800–300 BC until all the Anatolian languages were extinct due to Hellenization.
 The original Old Italic alphabets was the early Greek alphabet with only slight modifications.
 It was used in some Paleo-Balkan languages, including Thracian. For other neighboring languages or dialects, such as Ancient Macedonian, isolated words are preserved in Greek texts, but no continuous texts are preserved.
 The Greco-Iberian alphabet was used for writing the ancient Iberian language in parts of modern Spain.
 Gaulish inscriptions (in modern France) used the Greek alphabet until the Roman conquest
 The Hebrew and Aramaic text of the Bible was written in Greek letters in Origen's Hexapla.
 The Bactrian language, an Iranian language spoken in what is now Afghanistan, was written in the Greek alphabet during the Kushan Empire (65–250 AD). It adds an extra letter  for the sh sound .
 The Coptic alphabet adds eight letters derived from Demotic. It is still used today, mostly in Egypt, to write Coptic, the liturgical language of Egyptian Christians. Letters usually retain an uncial form different from the forms used for Greek today. The alphabet of Old Nubian is an adaptation of Coptic.

Middle Ages 
 An 8th-century Arabic fragment preserves a text in the Greek alphabet, as does a 9th or 10th century psalm translation fragment.
 An Old Ossetic inscription of the 10th–12th centuries found in Arxyz, the oldest known attestation of an Ossetic language.
 The Old Nubian language of Makuria (modern Sudan) adds three Coptic letters, two letters derived from Meroitic script, and a digraph of two Greek gammas used for the velar nasal sound.
 Various South Slavic dialects, similar to the modern Bulgarian and Macedonian languages, have been written in Greek script. The modern South Slavic languages now use modified Cyrillic alphabets.

Early modern 

 Turkish spoken by Orthodox Christians (Karamanlides) was often written in Greek script, and called Karamanlidika.
 Tosk Albanian was often written using the Greek alphabet, starting in about 1500. The printing press at Moschopolis published several Albanian texts in Greek script during the 18th century. It was only in 1908 that the Monastir conference standardized a Latin orthography for both Tosk and Gheg. Greek spelling is still occasionally used for the local Albanian dialects (Arvanitika) in Greece.
 Gagauz, a Turkic language of the northeast Balkans spoken by Orthodox Christians, was apparently written in Greek characters in the late 19th century.  In 1957, it was standardized on Cyrillic, and in 1996, a Gagauz alphabet based on Latin characters was adopted (derived from the Turkish alphabet).
 Surguch, a Turkic language, was spoken by a small group of Orthodox Christians in northern Greece.  It is now written in Latin or Cyrillic characters.
 Urum or Greek Tatar, spoken by Orthodox Christians, used the Greek alphabet.
 Judaeo-Spanish or Ladino, a Jewish dialect of Spanish, has occasionally been published in Greek characters in Greece.
 The Italian humanist Giovan Giorgio Trissino tried to add some Greek letters (Ɛ ε, Ꞷ ω) to Italian orthography in 1524.

In mathematics and science 

Greek symbols are used as symbols in mathematics, physics and other sciences. Many symbols have traditional uses, such as lower case epsilon (ε) for an arbitrarily small positive number, lower case pi (π) for the ratio of the circumference of a circle to its diameter, capital sigma (Σ) for summation, and lower case sigma (σ) for standard deviation. Formerly, the Greek letters were used for naming North Atlantic hurricanes if the normal list ran out. This happened only in the 2005 and 2020 hurricane seasons for a total of 15 storms, the last one being Hurricane Iota. In May 2021 the World Health Organization announced that the variants of SARS-CoV-2 of the virus would be named using letters of the Greek alphabet to avoid stigma and simplify communications for non-scientific audiences.

Astronomy 

Greek letters are used to denote the brighter stars within each of the eighty-eight constellations. In most constellations, the brightest star is designated Alpha and the next brightest Beta etc. For example, the brightest star in the constellation of Centaurus is known as Alpha Centauri. For historical reasons, the Greek designations of some constellations begin with a lower ranked letter.

International Phonetic Alphabet 
Several Greek letters are used as phonetic symbols in the International Phonetic Alphabet (IPA). Several of them denote fricative consonants; the rest stand for variants of vowel sounds. The glyph shapes used for these letters in specialized phonetic fonts is sometimes slightly different from the conventional shapes in Greek typography proper, with glyphs typically being more upright and using serifs, to make them conform more with the typographical character of other, Latin-based letters in the phonetic alphabet. Nevertheless, in the Unicode encoding standard, the following three phonetic symbols are considered the same characters as the corresponding Greek letters proper:

On the other hand, the following phonetic letters have Unicode representations separate from their Greek alphabetic use, either because their conventional typographic shape is too different from the original, or because they also have secondary uses as regular alphabetic characters in some Latin-based alphabets, including separate Latin uppercase letters distinct from the Greek ones.

The symbol in Americanist phonetic notation for the voiceless alveolar lateral fricative is the Greek letter lambda , but  in the IPA.

Use as numerals 

Greek letters were also used to write numbers. In the classical Ionian system, the first nine letters of the alphabet stood for the numbers from 1 to 9, the next nine letters stood for the multiples of 10, from 10 to 90, and the next nine letters stood for the multiples of 100, from 100 to 900. For this purpose, in addition to the 24 letters which by that time made up the standard alphabet, three otherwise obsolete letters were retained or revived: digamma  for 6, koppa  for 90, and a rare Ionian letter for [ss], today called sampi , for 900. This system has remained in use in Greek up to the present day, although today it is only employed for limited purposes such as enumerating chapters in a book, similar to the way Roman numerals are used in English. To mark a letter as a numeral sign, a small stroke called keraia is added to the right of it.

Use by student fraternities and sororities 
In North America, many college fraternities and sororities are named with combinations of Greek letters, and are hence also known as "Greek letter organizations". This naming tradition was initiated by the foundation of the Phi Beta Kappa Society at the College of William and Mary in 1776. The name of this fraternal organization is an acronym for the ancient Greek phrase Φιλοσοφία Βίου Κυβερνήτης (Philosophia Biou Kybernētēs), which means "Love of wisdom, the guide of life" and serves as the organization's motto. Sometimes early fraternal organizations were known by their Greek letter names because the mottos that these names stood for were secret and revealed only to members of the fraternity.

Different chapters within the same fraternity are almost always (with a handful of exceptions) designated using Greek letters as serial numbers. The founding chapter of each respective organization is its A chapter. As an organization expands, it establishes a B chapter, a Γ chapter, and so on and so forth. In an organization that expands to more than 24 chapters, the chapter after Ω chapter is AA chapter, followed by AB chapter, etc. Each of these is still a "chapter Letter", albeit a double-digit letter just as 10 through 99 are double-digit numbers. The Roman alphabet has a similar extended form with such double-digit letters when necessary, but it is used for columns in a table or chart rather than chapters of an organization.

Glyph variants 
Some letters can occur in variant shapes, mostly inherited from medieval minuscule handwriting. While their use in normal typography of Greek is purely a matter of font styles, some such variants have been given separate encodings in Unicode.
 The symbol  ("curled beta") is a cursive variant form of beta (β).
 The letter delta has a form resembling a cursive capital letter D; while not encoded as its own form, this form is included as part of the symbol for the drachma (a Δρ digraph) in the Currency Symbols block, at U+20AF (₯).
The symbol ϵ (U+03F5) is designated specifically for the lunate form, used as a technical symbol.
 The symbol  ("script theta") is a cursive form of theta (θ), frequent in handwriting, and used with a specialized meaning as a technical symbol.
 The symbol  ("kappa symbol") is a cursive form of kappa (κ), used as a technical symbol.
 The symbol  ("variant pi") is an archaic script form of pi (π), also used as a technical symbol.
 The letter rho (ρ) can occur in different stylistic variants, with the descending tail either going straight down or curled to the right. The symbol  (U+03F1) is designated specifically for the curled form, used as a technical symbol.
 The letter sigma, in standard orthography, has two variants: ς, used only at the ends of words, and σ, used elsewhere. The form  ("lunate sigma", resembling a Latin c) is a medieval stylistic variant that can be used in both environments without the final/non-final distinction.
 The capital letter upsilon (Υ) can occur in different stylistic variants, with the upper strokes either straight like a Latin Y, or slightly curled. The symbol ϒ (U+03D2) is designated specifically for the curled form, used as a technical symbol, e.g. in physics.
The symbol  (U+03D5) is designated specifically for the closed form, used as a technical symbol.
 The letter omega has at least three stylistic variants of its capital form. The standard is the "open omega" (Ω), resembling an open partial circle with the opening downward and the ends curled outward. The two other stylistic variants are seen more often in modern typography, resembling a raised and underscored circle (roughly o̲), where the underscore may or may not be touching the circle on a tangent (in the former case it resembles a superscript omicron similar to that found in the numero sign or masculine ordinal indicator; in the latter, it closely resembles some forms of the Latin letter Q). The open omega is always used in symbolic settings and is encoded in Letterlike Symbols (U+2126) as a separate code point for backward compatibility.

Computer encodings 

The two principal ones still used today are ISO/IEC 8859-7 and Unicode. ISO 8859-7 supports only the monotonic orthography; Unicode supports both the monotonic and polytonic orthographies.

ISO/IEC 8859-7 
For the range A0–FF (hex), it follows the Unicode range 370–3CF (see below) except that some symbols, like ©, ½, § etc. are used where Unicode has unused locations. Like all ISO-8859 encodings, it is equal to ASCII for 00–7F (hex).

Greek in Unicode 

Unicode supports polytonic orthography well enough for ordinary continuous text in modern and ancient Greek, and even many archaic forms for epigraphy. With the use of combining characters, Unicode also supports Greek philology and dialectology and various other specialized requirements. Most current text rendering engines do not render diacritics well, so, though alpha with macron and acute can be represented as U+03B1 U+0304 U+0301, this rarely renders well: .

There are two main blocks of Greek characters in Unicode. The first is "Greek and Coptic" (U+0370 to U+03FF). This block is based on ISO 8859-7 and is sufficient to write Modern Greek. There are also some archaic letters and Greek-based technical symbols.

This block also supports the Coptic alphabet. Formerly, most Coptic letters shared codepoints with similar-looking Greek letters; but in many scholarly works, both scripts occur, with quite different letter shapes, so as of Unicode 4.1, Coptic and Greek were disunified. Those Coptic letters with no Greek equivalents still remain in this block (U+03E2 to U+03EF).

To write polytonic Greek, one may use combining diacritical marks or the precomposed characters in the "Greek Extended" block (U+1F00 to U+1FFF).

Combining and letter-free diacritics 
Combining and spacing (letter-free) diacritical marks pertaining to Greek language:

Encodings with a subset of the Greek alphabet 
IBM code pages 437, 860, 861, 862, 863, and 865 contain the letters ΓΘΣΦΩαδεπστφ (plus β as an alternative interpretation for ß).

See also
Greek Font Society
Greek ligatures
Palamedes
Romanization of Greek

Notes

References

Bibliography 

 
 
 
 
 
 
 
 
 
 
 
  [Greek translation of Greek: a history of the language and its speakers, London 1997]
 
 
 
 
 
 
  – selections from the Gospels in Macedonian.

External links 

 Greek and Coptic character list in Unicode
 Unicode collation charts—including Greek and Coptic letters, sorted by shape
 Examples of Greek handwriting
 
 Unicode FAQ – Greek Language and Script
 alphabetic test for Greek Unicode range (Alan Wood)
 numeric test for Greek Unicode range
 Classical Greek keyboard, a browser-based tool
 Collection of free fonts: greekfontsociety.gr